Reverberation is  an Australian independent record label distributor. It helps distribute records from independent overseas records labels such as Alternative Tentacles and Eyeball Records, and also for small record labels such as Love Police Records and their own label Reverberation.

Reverberation was started in 2003 by Russell Hopkinson (You Am I) and Ian Underwood (The Kryptonics).

Representation

Labels
 Art School Dropout 
 Big Radio 
 Blazing Strumpet 
 Butcher's Hook 
 Cass 
 Caveman 
 Coqi 
 Daptone 
 Funhouse 
 Helltrack 
 Illustrious Artists 
 Livecast 
 Love Police 
 Memorandum 
 Microindie 
 Pee Records
 Red Recordings 
 Reverberation 
 Spasticated 
 Two Bucks

Bands

 Brian Jonestown Massacre
 Children Collide
 The Cops
 D.O.A.
 The Holy Soul
 The Fuzz
 Dave Graney & Clare Moore
 Loene Carmen
 Mexico City
 Midnight Juggernauts
 The Queers
 Red Riders
 Richie and the Creeps
 Schvendes
 Sloan
 Tim Steward
 The Whats
 The Flower Machine
 The Wright Hill

See also 
 List of record labels

External links
 Official site
 AMO website

Record labels established in 2003
Australian independent record labels
Alternative rock record labels
Record label distributors